Musa Çağıran (born 17 November 1992) is a Turkish footballer who plays as a midfielder for Hatayspor. He has also made an appearance for Turkey's national football B team.

Career
He signed for Galatasaray on 3 February 2010, signing a three-year contract  but was allowed to see out the rest of the season at Altay. However, having turned out only once for Galatasaray, Çagiran signed on for Konyaspor, on loan, and then on to Bursaspor full-time. 

He stayed at Bursaspor until 2014 (three years), playing 51 games and scoring twice. The midfielder then went on to join Karabukspor; here he appeared in 43 games and scoring four times, a better record than that of his time with Bursaspor. After Karabukspor, Musa Çagiran signed a deal with Osmanlispor, with whom he played in four Europa League games: against Steaua, Villareal and Zürich.

On 22 June 2022, Çağıran signed a two-year contract (with an optional third year) with Hatayspor.

International career
Between 2008 and 2015 Musa Çagiran made appearances for Turkey's U17s, U18s, U21s and B team.

Career statistics

References

External links
 Statistics at TFF.org 
 

1992 births
People from Ilgın
Living people
Turkish footballers
Turkey under-21 international footballers
Turkey youth international footballers
Association football midfielders
Altay S.K. footballers
Göztepe S.K. footballers
Galatasaray S.K. footballers
Konyaspor footballers
Bursaspor footballers
Kardemir Karabükspor footballers
Ankaraspor footballers
Çaykur Rizespor footballers
Alanyaspor footballers
Hatayspor footballers
Süper Lig players
TFF First League players